Wang Zhonglin (born 13 August 1962) is a Chinese politician. He has been Governor of Hubei since May 2021. Previously he served as Communist party Secretary of Wuhan, and before that he served as Communist Party Secretary of Jinan and a Shandong provincial party standing committee member. Wang is a delegate to the 13th National People's Congress.

Early life and education
Wang was born in Fei County, Shandong in August 1962. In September 1980, he enrolled at East China University of Political Science and Law, majoring in criminal law, where he graduated in July 1984. He obtained a Doctor of Management degree from the Ocean University of China in June 2011.

Career in Shandong
Wang joined the Communist Party of China in June 1984. He served in various posts in Zaozhuang municipal government before serving as Communist Party Secretary of Tengzhou, a county-level city of Zaozhuang, in December 2006. In March 2007 he became a standing committee member of the CPC Zaozhuang Municipal Committee. In December 2011, he was Deputy Communist Party Secretary of Liaocheng, he concurrently served mayor of the city in March 2013. During his tenure, he focused on urban demolition and reconstruction, which won him national reputation. In July 2015, he was transferred to Jinan, capital of Shandong province, where he was appointed Director and Party Branch Secretary of Shandong Provincial Development and Reform Commission. One year later, he was named Deputy Communist Party Secretary, Party Branch Secretary and Acting Mayor of Jinan, replacing Yang Luyu, who was placed under investigation by the Central Commission for Discipline Inspection, the party's internal disciplinary body, for "serious violations of regulations" in early April. In May 2018, he was promoted to become Communist Party Secretary of Jinan and standing committee member of the CPC Shandong Provincial Committee.

Career in Hubei
On 12 February 2020, he was appointed Communist Party Secretary of Wuhan, succeeding Ma Guoqiang, who was removed from public offices for his response to the coronavirus pandemic.

On 7 May 2021, he was appointed the acting governor of Hubei.

References

1962 births
Living people
People from Fei County
East China University of Political Science and Law alumni
Ocean University of China alumni
People's Republic of China politicians from Jiangsu
Chinese Communist Party politicians from Jiangsu
Delegates to the 13th National People's Congress
Governors of Hubei